Thomas Keiser (born March 28, 1989) is an American football linebacker who is currently a free agent. Keiser played college football at Stanford University.

Early years
Keiser attended high school at North Allegheny Senior High School and played for the Tigers before graduating in 2007.

College career
Keiser played college football at Stanford. He entered the 2011 NFL Draft after his junior season.

Professional career

Carolina Panthers 
Keiser was signed by the Carolina Panthers as an undrafted free agent on July 30, 2011. He was waived on September 4, 2011, but was re-signed to the Panthers’ practice squad on September 6, 2011. Keiser was signed to the active roster on November 8, 2011. He was waived by the Panthers on May 13, 2013.

San Diego Chargers 
Keiser signed with the San Diego Chargers on May 17, 2013. He was released on August 31, 2013, but was signed to the Chargers' practice squad on September 1, 2013. Keiser was signed to the active roster on October 1, 2013. Keiser proved to be a physical linebacker, playing 12 games, while starting 3, collecting 21 tackles, 4.5 sacks, and an interception. Keiser intercepted Peyton Manning in week 15 to seal the game and win for the chargers. He was released on August 30, 2014.

Arizona Cardinals
Keiser was claimed off waivers by the Arizona Cardinals on August 31, 2014. He was released on November 14, 2014.

San Jose SaberCats
Keiser was assigned to the San Jose SaberCats of the Arena Football League (AFL) on December 3, 2014. He was placed on reassignment on March 27, 2015.

Personal life 
Keiser is married to Heimana Vaea-Maafu-Moimoi Keiser.

References

External links

Thomas Keiser Official Website

 Carolina Panthers bio
 San Diego Chargers bio
 Stanford Cardinal bio r

1989 births
Living people
Players of American football from Pennsylvania
American football defensive ends
American football linebackers
Stanford Cardinal football players
Carolina Panthers players
San Diego Chargers players
Arizona Cardinals players
San Jose SaberCats players